Township 11 is a township in Rooks County, Kansas, United States. Plainville is the largest population center in Township 11.

History
Rooks County was established with four townships: Bow Creek, Lowell, Paradise and Stockton. That number increased to seven by 1878 and twenty three in 1925. The twenty three townships were in place until 1971 when the number was reduced to the current twelve townships.

Township 11 was formed from Rooks County townships Plainville and Twin Mound in 1971 pursuant to Kansas Statute 80-1110. 80-1110 allowed for the disorganization of townships and assigning those territories to contiguous townships.

Paradise Creek, labeled as Salt Creek on early maps, originates in Township 11 then flows eastward into the Saline River in Russell County.

Plainville Township
Plainville Township was established in 1879 from Paradise Township. Fairview, Logan, Northampton and Walton townships were eventually formed from parts of Plainville township. Plainville remained a double township until Township 11 was created.

Twin Mound Township
Twin Mound Township was established in 1879 from part of Paradise Township. The township was named for two unique blue-green, hard rock mounds that bore the Twin Mound name.

References

Townships in Rooks County, Kansas
Townships in Kansas